"La canzone mononota" is a 2013 single by Elio e le Storie Tese.

Elio e le Store Tese participated with this song to the Sanremo Music Festival 2013, achieving the second place and winning the Critics' Award "Mia Martini", the award for the best arrangement and the Radio and TV Press-Room award.

Faithfully complying with its title, which translates to The One-Note Song, most of the song is sung on one note, i.e. C or Do.

Charts

References

External links

Italian-language songs
2013 singles
Sanremo Music Festival songs
Sony Music singles
2013 songs